Helianthus cusickii is a species of sunflower known by the common names Cusick's sunflower and turniproot sunflower. It is native to the western United States from Washington, Oregon, Idaho, northern California, and northwestern Nevada.

Helianthus cusickii grows in mountain forests and foothills. This wildflower is a perennial up to 120 cm (4 feet) tall, growing from a thick, fleshy taproot. The lance-shaped leaves reach 15 centimeters (6 inches) in length, and the stem and foliage are often covered in long hairs. The flower heads have a base of long, hairy green phyllaries. The center of the head is filled with at least 40 yellow disc florets surrounded by 12–16 ray florets.

Some Plateau Indian tribes used the roots to treat erectile dysfunction, wasting, and tuberculosis.

References

External links
Jepson Manual Treatment
United States Department of Agriculture Plants Profile
University of Washington, Burke Museum, Washington Profile and Photos

cusickii
Flora of the Western United States
Plants described in 1886
Flora without expected TNC conservation status